Kozów may refer to the following places in Poland:
Kozów, Lower Silesian Voivodeship (south-west Poland)
Kozów, Świętokrzyskie Voivodeship (south-central Poland)
Kozów, Lubusz Voivodeship (west Poland)